Iamb, iambus, or iambic may refer to:

Meter and poetry

Classical poetry and quantitative verse
 Iamb (poetry)
 Choliamb
 Iambus (genre)

Accentual-syllabic and syllabic verse
 Iambic trimeter
 Iambic tetrameter
 Iambic pentameter
 Iambic hexameter, or the alexandrine
 Iambic heptameter, or the fourteener

Other uses
 Iamb (band)
 Iambic key/keyer
 Iambic Productions
 , grammarian

See also
 Iambe